Paddy Summerfield (born 1947) is a British photographer who has lived and worked in Oxford in the UK all his life.

Summerfield is known for his "evocative series of black and white images, shot on 35mm film, which co-opt the traditional genre of documentary photography to realise a more personal and inward looking vision." He has said his photographs are exclusively about abandonment and loss.

Life and career
After taking an Art Foundation course at the Oxford Polytechnic, Summerfield attended Guildford School of Art, studying firstly in the Photography Department, then joining the Film department the following year. In 1967, when still a first-year student, he made photographs that appeared in 1970 in Bill Jay's magazine Album. Between 1968 and 1978, Summerfield documented Oxford University students in the summer terms. His pictures published in Creative Camera, and on its cover in January 1974, were recognised as psychological and expressionist, unusual in an era of journalistic and documentary photography. Throughout his life, Summerfield has focused on making photographic essays that are personal documents. From 1997 to 2007 he photographed his parents, his mother with Alzheimer's disease and his father caring for her.

Like It Is was Summerfield's first London exhibition, a group show in Dixon's Photographic Gallery, Oxford Street, in 1967. Since then, his work has been exhibited at other London venues, including the ICA Gallery, the Serpentine Gallery, the Barbican, and The Photographers' Gallery in its Newport Street home. When Nicholas Serota was director of the Museum of Modern Art, Oxford, he offered Summerfield the opportunity to exhibit Beneath the Dreaming Spires, his first one-man show, in 1976.

During his early career, he was awarded several Arts Council grants.

Publications

Books by Summerfield 
Mother and Father. Stockport, UK: Dewi Lewis, 2014. .
The Oxford Pictures 1968–1978. Stockport, UK: Dewi Lewis, 2016. .
Empty Days. Stockport, UK: Dewi Lewis, 2018. .
The Holiday Pictures. Stockport, UK: Dewi Lewis, 2019. .

Smaller publications by Summerfield 
Weekend Away. Southport, UK: Café Royal, 2016. Edition of 200 copies.
Remember Hope. Photopaper 17. Fotobookfestival Kassel, 2017. Edited by Gerry Badger.
Distant Times. Southport, UK: Café Royal, 2018. Edition of 250 copies.

Publications with others 
Serpentine Photography 73: The Arts Council presents work by 43 young photographers. London: Arts Council of Great Britain, 1973. . 45 cards (90 sides) in an envelope.
Family: Photographers Photograph Their Families. Edited by Sophie Spencer-Wood. London and New York: Phaidon, 2005. .

Exhibitions

Solo exhibitions 
1976: Beneath the Dreaming Spires, Museum of Modern Art, Oxford; Institute of Contemporary Arts, London
1992: Retrospective, Ruskin School of Art, Oxford
2005: Empty Days, Ovada, Oxford
2019–2020 The Holiday Pictures, Flow Photographic Gallery, London

Group exhibitions 
1967: Like It Is, Dixon's Photographic Gallery, London
1971: Young Contemporaries I Creative Camera Travelling Exhibition
1972: Young Contemporaries II Creative Camera Travelling Exhibition
1973: Serpentine Photography '73, Serpentine Gallery, London. Curated by Peter Turner
1974: Co-Optic Real Britain, 19 February – 9 March. With Co-Optic group members Martin Parr, Chris Steele-Perkins, Peter Turner, and Nick Hedges.
1975: Young British Photographers, with Brian Griffin, Chris Steele-Perkins, etc, Museum of Modern Art, Oxford; The Photographers' Gallery, London; then travelling UK, Europe, USA
1975: International Photography, Museum of Modern Art, São Paulo
1976: Previous Exhibitors, Serpentine Gallery, London
1977: Singular Realities, Museum of Modern Art, Oxford; Side Gallery, Newcastle
1977: Concerning Photography, 6 July – 27 August, The Photographers' Gallery, London
1982: The Third Meaning, Museum of Modern Art, Oxford
1982: Under the Arches, Stedelijk Museum, Leiden
1984: Sequences, Cambridge Darkroom
1987: The Bradford Challenge, National Museum of Photography, Film and Television, Bradford
1988: Death, Cambridge Darkroom
1989: Through the Looking Glass, Barbican Centre, London
1989: Sun Life Photography Awards, National Museum of Photography, Film and Television, Bradford
2004: English Eyes, Leica Gallery, New York City. Curated by Peter Hamilton.

Film about Summerfield
Mother and Father (2015) – FullBleed Productions

Collections 
Arts Council of Great Britain, London
Victoria and Albert Museum, London
Martin Parr Foundation, Bristol, UK

Notes

References

External links

Paddy Summerfield: Mother & Father – short film made by FullBleed, on YouTube

1947 births
Living people
People from Derby
People from Oxford
Photographers from Oxfordshire